The 2010 Shelby American at Las Vegas was a NASCAR Sprint Cup Series motor race that was held on February 28, 2010 at Las Vegas Motor Speedway in Las Vegas, Nevada as the third race of the 2010 NASCAR Sprint Cup season The race consisted of 267 laps, 400.5 miles (645 km).

The race began with Kurt Busch, from Penske Racing, on the pole. During the race there were ten different leaders, twenty lead changes, and seven cautions. Jimmie Johnson, from Hendrick Motorsports, ended up winning the 2010 Shelby American while Kevin Harvick finished 2nd and Jeff Gordon finished third after leading the most laps (219).

Race report

Practices and qualifying

In the first practice session on February 26, the fastest were Juan Pablo Montoya, Sam Hornish Jr., Jimmie Johnson, Mark Martin, Jeff Gordon. In the second practice session, Kyle Busch, Greg Biffle, Kurt Busch, David Reutimann, and Clint Bowyer were the fastest. In final practice Clint Bowyer, Juan Pablo Montoya, Mark Martin, Jimmie Johnson, and Marcos Ambrose were the fastest. Unlike the first two practice sessions, final practice had one red flag because Dale Earnhardt Jr. spun to pit road.

Race summary
On February 28, 2010, at 3 p.m. EST, Las Vegas Motor Speedway's Chaplain Joe Freiburger said the invocation. Afterward, America's Got Talent winner Terry Fator sang the national anthem. Carroll Shelby and Kim Kardashian gave the command "Gentlemen, start your engines!" for the race.

On the start, Kurt Busch led the field to the green flag. On the same lap, Jeff Gordon passed Kurt Busch for the lead. On lap 2, Kevin Conway collided with the wall; to cause the first caution. On lap 5, Jeff Gordon led the field to the green flag. After the restart, the field became spread out, but on lap 45, Mike Bliss collided with the wall to bring out the second caution. The restart happened on lap 52, with Jeff Gordon leading. One lap later, Greg Biffle passed Gordon, and the third caution came out. The third caution came out because the caution lights did not turn off. On the lap 56 restart, Greg Biffle led the field to the green flag, but one lap later, Jeff Gordon reclaimed the lead.

The race then experienced a 30 lap run that ended because Sam Hornish Jr. spun to bring out the fourth caution. All the leaders pitted, but the first one off pit road was Matt Kenseth. On lap 92, Matt Kenseth led them down for the restart. One lap later, though, the fifth caution came out because Jamie McMurray collided with Juan Pablo Montoya. A. J. Allmendinger was also involved in the accident. The restart happened on lap 97 with Kenseth still the leader, but on lap 98, Jeff Gordon passed him. On lap 107, the sixth caution came out because the caution lights inadvertently turned on. Most lead lap cars made their pit stop, but Scott Speed stayed out to become the leader.

On lap 113, Scott Speed led the field to the green flag. Also, on the restart, Scott Speed had a horrible start, that caused Jeff Gordon to pass him. From lap 113 to 228, a long green flag run happened. On lap 158, green flag pit stops began. During the pit stops the leaders were Jimmie Johnson, Kevin Harvick, Kyle Busch, Tony Stewart. Afterwards, the top-five drivers were Jeff Gordon, Jimmie Johnson, Matt Kenseth, Jeff Burton, and Kevin Harvick. Then on lap 212, green flag pit stops happened again. After the pit stops the leader was Jeff Gordon. On lap 228, the seventh caution came out because Kevin Conway collided with the wall. Clint Bowyer stayed off pit road to lead on the restart. Immediately after the start, on lap 233, Jeff Gordon reclaimed the lead. On lap 251, Jimmie Johnson passed Jeff Gordon for the lead. Jimmie Johnson kept the lead to win his second consecutive race in 2010.

Race results

References

Shelby American
Shelby American
NASCAR races at Las Vegas Motor Speedway
February 2010 sports events in the United States